María Simón Padrós (1922 - July 5, 2009) was an Argentine sculptor.

Biography
Simón was born in Aguilares, Tucumán in 1922. Her father, John Simon Padrós, was an engineer, a prominent politician and industrialist; her mother was Emilia Dublé.

At the age of 20, Simón studied sculpture with Jean Labourdette and five years later, with Libero Bardi. In 1964, she obtained a grant awarded by the British Council and moved to London, where she exhibited at the Institute of Contemporary Arts (ICA). Two years later, she received the Georges Braque Prize, and decided to move to Paris, where she remained for thirty-five years. There, she participated in various exhibitions at the Galería Rioboo, Salones de Mayo, Réalités Nouvelles, and the Museo de Bellas Artes. She also participated in the Venice Biennale (1972), Biennale of Tapestry in Lausanne, Biennials of Engraving at Ljubljana and in Puerto Rico, the First International Sculpture Street Exhibition in Santa Cruz de Tenerife, and the Basel Fail. In 1975, she won the Second Prize in Sculpture at the Biennial of São Paulo, and the First Prize at the Biennale Gravure Gibet in France. In 1981, she was awarded the Bronze Medal by the European Academy of Fine Arts.

Simón worked predominantly in bronze, followed by iron and aluminum. She used lead, resin, acrylic, textiles, cardboard or wood in her works. In Paris, she experimented with cardboard boxes collected from the street. The box becomes a symbol of the human being discarded after use. Simón moved to Buenos Aires in 2001, where she lived and worked until her death in 2009.

References

1922 births
2009 deaths
People from Tucumán Province
Argentine women sculptors
Argentine sculptors
20th-century sculptors
20th-century Argentine women artists
Argentine expatriates in the United Kingdom